Springfield is an area of Wolverhampton in the United Kingdom near the city centre, and has undergone major redevelopment by The University of Wolverhampton. It is now Europe’s largest construction centre of excellence and home to an architecture and built environment super-campus, which also includes the newly built Brownfield Institute. It is included within the ward of Heath Town.

Places of interest
Landmarks within the district include the site of Wolverhampton Low Level railway station, and the disused Springfield Brewery that made Springfield Bitter from 1873 to 1991.

Springfield Brewery

The brewery first opened in 1873, when the William Butler and Company needed bigger premises than their existing site in Priestfield. Springfield had an abundance of water, and the land had remained fairly undeveloped as the ground was quite marshy in places. The company acquired the seven-acre site, partly bordering Grimstone Street and built a new brewery with maltings, cooperage and stables. Production started at Springfield during the following year. With the new brewery located close to the canal and railway lines, the company could begin to trade outside of the local area. The good communications also made the acquisition of public houses in other areas a viable proposition. This opportunity was improved when the Great Western Railway extended a siding into the site which was continually expanding to cope with the success of the company. Between 1881 and 1883 a new brewing tower was constructed, enabling William Butler and Company to increase production from 400 to 1,500 barrels a week. In 1960 Mitchell's and Butler's acquired the company and the Cape Hill brewery kept the Springfield Brewery open. Brewing stopped around 1990 and the site was used simply as distribution centre. In 2006 a fire destroyed much of the site.

In 2014 plans were announced by the University of Wolverhampton and Wolverhampton City Council to redevelop the site to become the home of the new West Midlands Construction UTC (University Technical College), which the university is sponsoring along with the Construction Industry Training Board (CITB). The university has now relocated its own School of Architecture and the Built Environment to the site making it a local, regional, national and international centre of excellence.

Victoria Hall
Victoria Hall is a block of student accommodation with four tower blocks. The tallest block is 25 stories and is the tallest modular building in Europe.

Famous residents
Don Howe, the footballer and football manager, was born at Springfield in 1935.

References

External links 
Springfield Brewery history
https://web.archive.org/web/20070518073725/http://www.larry-arnold.info/photography/Wolverhampton/index.htm
https://web.archive.org/web/20081119152401/http://www.springfieldbrewery.co.uk/ Historic film and images of the now destroyed Springfield Brewery Wolverhampton

Areas of Wolverhampton